Ana Rodríguez Sarmiento (born 7 November 1989, Lima), is a Peruvian singer, best known for being finalist of the reality television series Yo Soy, where she imitated the singer Amy Winehouse.

Career 
Rodríguez began to pay tribute to Amy Winehouse with her band "Addicted band" since 2009 in various music venues in Lima.

In April 2012, after passing an audition, she participated in Yo Soy (first season) broadcast by Frecuencia Latina as Winehouse. After two and a half months of competition, Rodríguez managed to reach the final. Rodriguez was contacted by musician Robin Banerjee "Burnin 'Bobby B'", guitarist Winehouse's band, who expressed his support for the competition and his intention to come to Lima to do a concert with her.

She told the press that will soon start recording their new album with her band.

On 23 July 2012, Rodríguez sang with Robin Barnejee in Lima, marking a year since the death of Winehouse. Rodríguez entered in the second season of the TV show Yo Soy (2013) in Peru. She continues to perform concerts in different parts in Peru.

References 
In Spanish

External links 

1989 births
Living people
Singers from Lima
21st-century Peruvian women singers
21st-century Peruvian singers